Jean Vallée (20 January 1899 – 19 July 1979) was a French film director, screenwriter and ran an art-house cinema theater L'Œil de Paris. He was credited for directing the first two French films in color.

Filmography
 Jeunes filles à marier (1935) - first colour feature shot in France
 La Terre qui meurt (1936) - second French colour feature-length film 
 The Men Without Names (1937)
 Troubled Heart (1938)
 Les surprises d'une nuit de noces (1952)
 L'étrange amazone (1953)

References

1899 births
1979 deaths
French film directors
20th-century French screenwriters